Carex diminuta is a tussock-forming species of perennial sedge in the family Cyperaceae. It is native to parts of China.

The species was first formally described by the botanist Johann Otto Boeckeler in 1890 as a part of the work Beitráge zur Kenntniss der Cyperaceen.

See also
List of Carex species

References

diminuta
Taxa named by Johann Otto Boeckeler
Plants described in 1890
Flora of China